Michael Hart, Mike Hart, or Mickey Hart may refer to:

Politicians 
 Michael Hart (mayor) (c. 1814–1878), New Zealand politician
 Michael J. Hart (1877–1951), American politician in Michigan
 Michael Hart (Australian politician) (born 1960), Australian politician in Queensland

Sportsmen 
 Mike Hart (switch hitter) (born 1951), MLB outfielder for the Texas Rangers
 Michael Hart (rower) (born 1951), British rower in 1972 Summer Olympics
 Mike Hart (left-handed hitter) (born 1958), MLB outfielder for the Minnesota Twins and Baltimore Orioles
 Mike Hart (poker player) (active since 1984), American poker player
 Michael Hart (footballer) (born 1980), Scottish footballer
 Mike Hart (American football) (born 1986), American football player and coach

Others 
 Michael Hart (political scientist) (born 1956), British academic at Exeter College, Oxford
 Michael Hart (judge) (1948–2007), judge of the High Court of England and Wales
 Michael H. Hart (born 1932), American physicist and futurist author
 Michael S. Hart (1947–2011), American founder of Project Gutenberg
 Mickey Hart (born 1943), drummer and musicologist with the Grateful Dead
 Mike Hart (singer-songwriter) (1943–2016), English poet and singer/songwriter from Liverpool